Frampton's Camel is the second studio album by English rock musician Peter Frampton, recorded and released in 1973. It was the first album that Frampton recorded in the United States. Most of the album was written in New York City. It reached number 110 on the USBillboard 200 Album Chart.

Background 
Frampton pursued a somewhat grittier sound on his second solo outing, 1973's Frampton's Camel, which was recorded in New York City at Jimi Hendrix's old Electric Lady Studios. Four years later, Frampton would record there again for his number 2 hit album I'm in You.

The album shared its name with the band Frampton assembled in 1972, which was actually more of a group project, including bassist Rick Wills, new drummer John Siomos, and keyboardist Mick Gallagher.  In fact, early editions of the LP, eight-track and cassettes all listed and denoted the album as "Frampton's Camel" by "Frampton's Camel".

Track listing
All tracks composed by Peter Frampton; except where indicated

Side One
"I Got My Eyes on You" - 4:29
"All Night Long" - 3:19 (Frampton, Mick Gallagher)
"Lines on My Face" - 4:50
"Which Way the Wind Blows" - 3:32
"I Believe (When I Fall in Love It Will Be Forever)" - 4:10 (Stevie Wonder, Yvonne Wright)

Side Two
"White Sugar" - 3:37
"Don't Fade Away" - 4:39
"Just the Time of Year" - 3:58
"Do You Feel Like We Do" - 6:44 (Frampton, Mick Gallagher, Rick Wills, John Siomos)

Personnel 
Peter Frampton - electric and acoustic guitars, drums, piano, Wurlitzer electric piano, Hammond organ, Hohner clavinet, vocals
Mick Gallagher - piano, Wurlitzer electric piano, Hammond organ, Hohner clavinet, vocals
Rick Wills -  Fender bass guitar
John Siomos - drums, percussion

Additional personnel 
Frank Carillo - acoustic and electric guitars, backing vocals
Eddie Kramer, Chris Kimsey, Dave Wittman, Doug Bennett - recording and mixing engineers

Charts 
Album

Single

References

Peter Frampton albums
1973 albums
Albums produced by Peter Frampton
Albums recorded at Electric Lady Studios
A&M Records albums
Albums recorded at Olympic Sound Studios